is a former Japanese basketball player.

References

1973 births
Living people
Japanese men's basketball players
Nagoya Diamond Dolphins players
Nihon University Red Sharks men's basketball players
Place of birth missing (living people)
1998 FIBA World Championship players
Universiade medalists in basketball
Universiade silver medalists for Japan
Medalists at the 1995 Summer Universiade